Artedius notospilotus, or the bonehead sculpin, is a species of marine ray-finned fish belonging to the family Cottidae, the typical sculpins.  Commonly found in the intertidal zone to depths of 170 feet, the species has a range extending from the Puget Sound, Washington to the Baja California peninsula.  It serves as the host for Podocotyle enophrysi, a species of parasitic flatworm.

References

External links
 Bonyhead sculpin (Artedius notospilotus) at the Encyclopedia of Life

notospilotus
Taxa named by Charles Frédéric Girard 
Fish described in 1856
Fish of the Pacific Ocean
Fish of the Western United States
Fish of Mexican Pacific coast